Arizona's 8th Legislative District is one of 30 in the state, covering most of Pinal County and a portion of Gila County. As of 2021, there are 69 precincts in the district, 51 in Pinal and 18 in Gila, with a total registered voter population of 124,619. The district has an overall population of 227,757.

Political representation
The district is represented for the 2021–2022 Legislative Session in the State Senate by T. J. Shope (R, Coolidge) and in the House of Representatives by David Cook (R, Casa Grande) and Frank Pratt (R, Casa Grande).

References

Pinal County, Arizona
Gila County, Arizona
Arizona legislative districts